Henry Franklin Winkler  (born October 30, 1945) is an American actor, comedian, author, producer, and director. After rising to fame as Arthur "Fonzie" Fonzarelli on the American television series Happy Days, Winkler has distinguished himself as a character actor for roles such as Arthur Himbry in Scream, Coach Klein in The Waterboy, Barry Zuckerkorn in Arrested Development, Eddie R. Lawson in Royal Pains, Dr. Saperstein in Parks and Recreation, Fritz in Monsters at Work, Stanley Yelnats III in Holes, Uncle Joe in The French Dispatch, Al Pratt in Black Adam, and Gene Cousineau in Barry. In 2016, he also became a reality television star on the NBC series Better Late Than Never. Winkler's accolades include a Primetime Emmy, two Daytime Emmys, two Golden Globe Awards, and two Critics Choice Awards.

As a child, Winkler struggled at P.S. 87 on West 78th Street, Manhattan and the McBurney School, where he was berated for his poor academic performance. He then studied theater at both Emerson College and the Yale School of Drama, spent a year and half with the Yale Repertory Theater, did regional theater and commercial work, and appeared in two independent films. After saving up money, he traveled to California in September 1973, and was cast in a small role for The Mary Tyler Moore Show. He also auditioned for Happy Days and won the part of Arthur "Fonzie" Fonzarelli, a role he played for the next ten years. During his time on Happy Days, Winkler was diagnosed as dyslexic.

After the end of Happy Days, Winkler found himself typecast and moved into producing and directing. He helped develop the original MacGyver television series and worked on programs such as Sightings and The Hollywood Squares. He also directed the theatrical releases Memories of Me with Billy Crystal and Cop and a Half with Burt Reynolds. In 2003, he drew upon his childhood struggles with dyslexia to co-write the Hank Zipzer series of children's books with children's literature author Lin Oliver. He and Oliver also created the BBC adaptation (in which Winkler appears as Mr. Rock) Hank Zipzer and the 2016 Christmas special, Hank Zipzer's Christmas Catastrophe. They next released the prequel book series Here's Hank, as well as two additional book series: the Ghost Buddy books, and the Alien Superstar books. 

Winkler has been honored for his role as "The Fonz", and for his work with dyslexia through the Hank Zipzer series. In 1980, he donated one of Fonzie's leather jackets to the National Museum of American History. In 1981, he received a star on the Hollywood Walk of Fame, and in 2008, The Bronze Fonz statue was unveiled along the Milwaukee Riverwalk. In 2011, he was appointed an Honorary Officer of the Order of the British Empire by Elizabeth II, and was named one of the United Kingdom's Top 10 Literacy Heroes in 2013.

Family history (1939–1945)

Winkler's parents, Ilse Anna Marie (née Hadra) and businessman Harry Irving Winkler were German Jews living in Berlin during the rise of Nazi Germany. By 1939, rising hostilities against Jews led his father to conclude that it was time to leave Germany. He arranged to take his wife on a six-week business trip to the United States. Although Winkler's Uncle Helmut was supposed to join them, at the last minute he decided to leave later, and was eventually taken away by the Nazis. Winkler later said, "At the time, my father, Harry, told my mother, Ilse, that they were traveling to the U.S. on a brief business trip. He knew they were never going back. Had he told my mother that they were leaving Germany for good, she might have insisted on remaining behind with her family. Many in their families who stayed perished during the Holocaust." Soon after arriving, his parents settled in New York City, where his father established a new version of his German company, which bought and sold wood.

Early life and education (1945–1970)
Henry Franklin Winkler was born on October 30, 1945, on the West Side of New York City's Manhattan borough. The "H" in his first name is a reference to his Uncle Helmut, while his middle name refers to President Franklin D. Roosevelt. He has an older sister named Beatrice, and is a cousin of actor Richard Belzer.

Although his family did not keep kosher, Winkler was raised in the traditions of Conservative Judaism. During his childhood, Winkler and his family spent their summers at Lake Mahopac, New York, and as a teenager, he was a water skiing instructor at Blue Mountain camps.

While growing up, Winkler had a difficult relationship with his father who "wanted me to go into the family business, buying and selling wood. But the only wood I was interested in was Hollywood.” When his father grew frustrated with Winkler's focus on acting, he would ask his son why he had brought the business over from Germany to the United States. Winkler would respond: "Besides being chased by the Nazis, Dad, was there a bigger reason than that?”

Difficulties in school
Winkler first attended P.S. 87 on West 78th Street, Manhattan, and then the McBurney School on Manhattan's Upper West Side. Although he was "outgoing" and "the class comedian" in school, he also lived in a state of "constant anxiety" over his struggles with schoolwork. His parents, who "would not tolerate poor marks," were perpetually frustrated by his poor grades, referred to him as "dummer hund" (dumb dog), and repeatedly punished him for his inability to excel in school. Winkler has said that this time period was "excruciating" as his "self-image was almost nonexistent." He has also stated:

In addition, his consistently poor academic performance made it difficult to be involved in the theater, as he was "grounded most of my high school career," and was almost never academically eligible. However, he did manage to appear in two theatrical productions: Billy Budd when he was in the eighth grade, and Of Thee I Sing in the eleventh grade.

Although Winkler graduated from the McBurney School in 1963, he was not allowed to attend graduation, as he had to repeat geometry for the fourth time during summer school. After finally passing the course, he received his diploma in the mail.

Emerson College (1963–1967)
Winkler applied to 28 colleges, but was admitted to only two of them, one of which was Emerson College in Boston, where he enrolled in 1963. He majored in theater and minored in child psychology, as he considered becoming a child psychologist if he did not succeed as an actor. He was also a member of the Alpha Pi Theta fraternity, and appeared in Emerson's production of Peer Gynt as the title character. Winkler later recalled that, "I nearly flunked out my first year [of Emerson], I almost flunked out my second year, but I was able to go for four years." He graduated in 1967, and in 1978, Emerson awarded him an honorary Doctor of Humane Letters (DHL).

Yale School of Drama (1967–1970)
During his senior year at Emerson, Winkler decided to audition for the Yale School of Drama. Although his then-undiagnosed dyslexia led to his forgetting the Shakespearean monologue he was supposed to perform, forcing him to improvise, Winkler was still admitted to the M.F.A. program in 1967.

He appeared in They Told Me That You Came This Way, Any Day Now, Any Day Now, and The Bacchae (as a member of the chorus). During the summers, he and his Yale classmates stayed in New Haven, and opened a summer stock theater called the New Haven Free Theater. They performed various plays including Woyzeck, where he portrayed the title role, and Just Add Water for improv night. He also performed in the political piece, The American Pig at the Joseph Papp Public Theater for the New York Shakespeare Festival in New York City, with classmates James Keach, James Naughton, and Jill Eikenberry. In addition, he also appeared in a number of Yale Repertory Theatre productions while still a student, including, The Government Inspector, The Rhesus Umbrella, Don Juan, Endgame, and The Physicists. He also appeared in Sweeney Agonistes and Hughie.

Winkler would later credit his time at Yale as critical to his future success, stating that he "used every morsel of what was given to me in drama, speech, dance, movement...when I did Happy Days, I used everything—the commedia dell'arte, the movement, the acting. We had teachers from the “poor theater” movement in Poland, which is about doing theater from nothing and speaking through your entire body as opposed to just your voice. I used that and all my movement training in the episode when Mork put a spell on the Fonz."

Out of his original cohort of 25 actors at Yale, Winkler was one of 11 who graduated when he received his MFA in 1970. Over two decades later in May 1996 he served as the Senior Class Day Speaker for Yale University's graduating seniors.

Early career (1970–1973)

Yale Repertory Theater (1970–1972)
After receiving his MFA in 1970, Winkler was one of three students from his graduating class of 11 who were invited to become a part of the Yale Repertory Theatre company. He joined on June 30, 1970, was paid $173 a week, and appeared throughout the 1970–71 season. He performed in Story Theater Reportory, Gimpel the Fool and Saint Julian the Hospitaler and Olympian Games. He also appeared in The Revenger's Tragedy, Where Has Tommy Flowers Gone?, Macbeth, and Woyzeck and Play. He also appeared in a double feature of two works by Bertolt Brecht, The Seven Deadly Sins (ballet chanté), and The Little Mahagonny during May–June 1971 and during January 20–29, 1972.

In the fall of 1971, Winkler was invited to be a part of the play Moonchildren which would open at the Arena Stage in Washington, D.C. Three weeks into rehearsals, the director Alan Schneider fired him as Winkler had been hired to fill the space until the actor that Schneider really wanted was available. At the time, Winkler was certain that because he had been fired, he would never be hired as an actor again.

New York and California (1972–1973)
Winkler moved back to New York, and began to audition for plays, movies, and commercials. However, he never had to work as a waiter because he was able to earn a living through performing in commercials. He was thus able to also perform with the Manhattan Theater Club for free.

Winkler's first appearance on Broadway was as "John" in 42 Seconds from Broadway, a play that opened and closed on March 11, 1973. He swore to himself that one day he would "make that right." By 1973, he had roles in two independent films,The Lords of Flatbush and Crazy Joe. He also performed with the improv group, Off the Wall New York. He continued to feel anxiety, however, with the process of cold reading during auditions, and depended upon compensation strategies: "I improvised. I never read anything the way that it was written in my entire life. I would read it. I could instantly memorize a lot of it and then what I didn't know, I made up and threw caution to the wind and did it with conviction and sometimes I made them laugh and sometimes I got hired."

By 1973, his agent told him that it was time to leave New York and explore possibilities in California. Although Winkler was initially resistant, thinking he was not a good fit for Hollywood, his agent was persistent. Winkler ultimately decided that he had earned enough money through his work in commercials to try Hollywood for one month. He and his Lords of Flatbush co-star, Perry King, thus traveled to Los Angeles on September 18, 1973. After meeting with his agency's west coast branch, and spending five days going to auditions, Winkler was hired for a small part on The Mary Tyler Moore Show, appearing in Season 4, Episode 10, "The Dinner Party."

Happy Days and additional roles (1973–1984)

During his second week in Los Angeles, Winkler auditioned for the part of Arthur Herbert Fonzarelli, better known as "Fonzie" or "The Fonz", on a new show called Happy Days. Although he was an unknown, and not the first choice for the role (as actors such as Micky Dolenz of The Monkees were also being considered), he was asked to return after his first audition for a second one in costume. He recalls that they plucked his "unibrow, combed my hair into a DA and put me in a white T-shirt and jeans." In addition, he also remembers that he decided to change his voice which "just unlocked me, and I realized I am NOT a leading man. I am a character actor." In costume, and with this new voice, Winkler said his six lines, threw his script in the air, and left the room. He was offered the role on his birthday, and accepted it based on his condition that the producers would show who the character was when he took his jacket off. Winkler appeared on the first episode of Happy Days in January 1974, and was continuously with the series until it ended in July 1984.

"The Fonz" was initially written as a minor role (based on a "tough guy" Garry Marshall knew in The Bronx), and developed as the foil to the central protagonist of the series, Richie Cunningham (Ron Howard). Winkler added his own interpretation of the character during the first episode, based on "a deal" he had made with himself that he would never comb his hair, chew gum, or keep a box of cigarettes rolled in his sleeve (as this is what actors typically did with this type of character). Although he tried to explain this philosophy to the producers, he was told he had to follow the script and comb his hair. He thus stood at the mirror, motioned in a way that suggested "Hey I don't have to because it's perfect," and in doing so, created the seminal moment which defined the character. In addition, ABC executives did not want to see Fonzie wearing leather, thinking it would imply that the character was a criminal. Thus, during the first season, Winkler wore two different windbreaker jackets, one of which was green. Marshall argued with the executives about the jacket, and eventually they made a compromise: Fonzie could wear the leather jacket, but only in scenes with his motorcycle. Marshall thus made certain that his motorcycle was written into every scene. In reality, Winkler did not know how to ride a motorcycle. As he almost crashed it the first time he tried, he subsequently never rode the motorcycle during the series.

By the middle of the second season in December 1974, "The Fonz" began his transition as a breakout character when he was featured as the central protagonist in the episode, "Guess Who's Coming to Christmas." By the third season, he became the lead of the series, as the storylines shifted away from the original protagonist, Richie Cunningham, to "The Fonz." Winkler recalled in a 2018 interview that he directly addressed the issue with Ron Howard who portrayed Richie, asking him "how has what's happened affected you? You are the star of the show, and the Fonz has taken off." According to Winkler, Howard told him that although he "was signed on as the star, you did nothing except be as good as you could be. It's good for the show, we're friends." In 2021, Howard reiterated these points by stating that Winkler had been "sort of a big brother" to him, and was "very supportive of the idea of me being a filmmaker."

In a 2018 interview with Winkler, journalist Michael Schneider suggests that it was at this point that "the Fonz, became the biggest icon on television" at that time. Winkler responded by stating that he "went from somebody who had no sense of self" to a situation that was "scary. People wanted, you know, parts of my clothing, it was overwhelming." He has also admitted that while he shares some characteristics with "The Fonz" such as loyalty to friends and an undercurrent of anger that he drew from his struggles with school as a child, they were fundamentally different from one another. According to Winkler, "The Fonz" was "my alter ego. He was everybody I wasn't...He was in charge. He was confident. He was everybody that I ever wanted to have some part of in my body."

Dyslexia 

During his time on Happy Days, Winkler realized that he was dyslexic, after his stepson Jed was diagnosed with this learning disability. Previously, Winkler only knew that aspects of reading and memorizing were difficult, but did not understand why. He thus developed coping mechanisms that allowed him to mask the difficulties he had with cold-reading scripts. If he was allowed to see the script prior to the reading, he would memorize it "as quickly as I could because I couldn't read the page and act at the same time to make an impression on the casting person or on the director and the producers...and I improvised the rest. And when they said, 'Well you're not doing what's written on the page,' I said, 'I'm giving you the essence of the character.'"

This technique, however, could not protect him from the Monday morning table reads for Happy Days. He later recalled that prior to learning about dyslexia, he frequently embarrassed himself in front of his fellow cast members as he would "stumble at least once or twice a paragraph. And then I was diagnosed, and I made fun of it—I covered it in humor. But I was humiliated...[as] when I didn't know what was going on for the first year or two, they laughed. I'm sure it was frustrating because I kept breaking up the rhythm of the joke or the scene. One line depends on another line—it depends on that flow coming in like a tributary from a river, and my tributaries kept getting like there was a beaver in the middle of them making a dam."

Additional film and television roles
During his decade on Happy Days, Winkler also appeared in a variety of roles in film and on television. In film, he appeared in Heroes (1977) with Harrison Ford and Sally Field, and was nominated for a Golden Globe Award for Best Actor – Motion Picture Drama. He later appeared in Carl Reiner's The One and Only (1978), and in Ron Howard's 1982 directorial debut, Night Shift with Shelley Long before she appeared in Cheers, and a then-unknown Michael Keaton. He was nominated for a Golden Globe Award for Best Actor – Motion Picture Musical or Comedy for his work in Night Shift.

In television, he served as executive producer and host for the 50-minute television version of the documentary, Who Are the DeBolts? And Where Did They Get Nineteen Kids?, (1978), which was nominated for a Primetime Emmy Award for Outstanding Informational Series or Special. He was also an executive producer for the ABC Afterschool Special: Run, Don't Walk (1981), based on the novel of the same name by Harriet May Savitz, and featuring his Happy Days co-star, Scott Baio. He further directed Baio in the 13th episode of the Happy Days spin-off, Joanie Loves Chachi, also starring Erin Moran.

In addition, Winkler starred in An American Christmas Carol (1979), and served as a co-host for the Music for UNICEF Concert (1979). He also appeared as "Fonzie" on Sesame Street to promote the letter "A" (ayyyy), later recalling that it was "the only time I ever appeared as the Fonz on something else. I had a strict rule about that, but they asked me and it was my pleasure. They came to the Happy Days set."

After Happy Days (1984–2003)
After Happy Days ended in 1984, Winkler was typecast, and could not get acting roles until 1991. He later stated that his "agent would put me out there and people would say, ‘You know, he's great, he's a wonderful guy, really good actor. Funny, So funny. But he was the Fonz.'" He has also said that it was a difficult time for him, as he wanted to be a "working actor," had "no idea what to do," and "found it to be psychically painful. I was rudderless." However, he states that he lives his life by "tenacity and gratitude," seeing himself as "that toy with sand at the bottom you punch it and it goes right back to center. That is it: You have to get up, dust yourself off and you have to just keep yourself moving forward." Thus, he started the production company, Fair Dinkum Productions, and various off-shoots. He chose the name in a nod to Australia, where "fair dinkum" is a common Australian term suggesting a person or thing is "direct," "honest," "fair," or "authentic". He set the company up with Paramount Pictures in the late 1970s. In 1987, he inked a new feature film and development pact with the studio.

Directing (1984–2002)
In 1984, Winkler directed, and was executive producer for, the CBS Schoolbreak Special: "All the Kids Do It" starring Scott Baio, which won the 1985 Daytime Emmy for Outstanding Children's Special (executive producer) and was nominated for the 1985 Daytime Emmy for Outstanding Directing in Children's Programming. In addition to a few episodes of television sitcoms that he directed in the late 1990s and early 2000s, Winkler directed his first theatrical release in 1988, Memories of Me with Billy Crystal. In 1993, he directed his second theatrical release, Cop and a Half, a film produced by Ron Howard's company, Imagine Entertainment, and starring Burt Reynolds.

Producing (1985–2003)
Winkler was an executive producer for Rob Reiner's second film as a director, The Sure Thing (1985). He was also the executive producer for the original MacGyver television series, which won the Genesis Award for Best TV Drama in 1991, and for Dead Man's Gun, which won the Bronze Wrangler in 1998. In 1988, he was the executive producer for the ABC Afterschool Special: A Family Again starring Jill Eikenberry and Michael Tucker. In addition, he was the executive producer for a number of series including Sightings and So Weird. In 2002, he partnered with Michael Levitt to revamp and update The Hollywood Squares for the fifth season of the 1998 reboot. It was nominated for a Daytime Emmy Award for Outstanding Game Show in 2003.

Acting (1991–2003)
Winkler returned to acting in the early 1990s. He starred in the 1991 television film, Absolute Strangers, and in the short-lived 1994 television series Monty with David Schwimmer (before his debut on Friends). He also starred in the 1994 television film One Christmas, with Katharine Hepburn in her last role, and Swoosie Kurtz.

In 1996, he appeared in his friend Wes Craven's 1996 film Scream as foul-mouthed high school principal Arthur Himbry. His role was uncredited, however, as the producers were concerned that he would only be seen as The Fonz, and thus distract from the film. After it was screened, though, and audiences responded well to his role in it, he was asked to do publicity for Scream.

In 2000, Winkler was nominated for a Primetime Emmy, Outstanding Guest Actor in a Drama Series, for his portrayal of Dr. Henry Olson in three episodes of The Practice. He also portrayed Stanley Yelnats III in Holes (2003).

Work with Adam Sandler

Winkler began to collaborate with Adam Sandler in the 1990s, after Sandler included Fonzie in the Saturday Night Live skit, The Chanukah Song (1994). Winkler called Sandler to thank him, which led first to a friendship, and later to the role of Coach Klein in the 1998 film The Waterboy, and as Sandler's father in Click (2006). He also made cameo appearances in Little Nicky (2000), You Don't Mess with the Zohan (2008), and Sandy Wexler (2017).

Work with John Ritter
Winkler worked on a few projects with his longtime friend, actor John Ritter, whom he first met in 1978 at ABC's 25th anniversary party, when Winkler was still on Happy Days, and Ritter was Jack Tripper on the television series Three's Company. He directed Ritter in the 1986 television movie A Smoky Mountain Christmas starring Dolly Parton, and in 1993, they co-starred in the made-for-television movie, The Only Way Out.

Later in 1999, Neil Simon gave Winkler the chance to be involved with his first theatrical production since 1973, when he asked him to do a read-through of The Dinner Party. Given the problems he had with cold-readings, Winkler initially panicked. However, he asked for the script in advance in order to memorize it, and managed to get through the reading. Simon eventually contacted Winkler again, and asked him to be in the theatrical version he was staging, to which Winkler agreed. He was also excited to be working with Ritter again. While their initial debut was not well-received, they were asked to perform the play in Washington D.C, which they did with a few casting changes, and to good reviews. The play then moved to Broadway, and again received positive reviews (which, Winkler states, made his initial experience in the 1973 show 42 Seconds from Broadway "right").

In September 2003, he was slated for a guest appearance on Ritter's show, 8 Simple Rules (for Dating my Teenage Daughter). However, during the filming of the episode, Ritter became ill and had to be taken to the hospital, dying hours later. The episode was never completed, and Winkler's role was dropped.

Arrested Development (2003–2019)

In 2003, Mitch Hurwitz wanted Winkler to portray the incompetent lawyer Barry Zuckerkorn on one episode of Arrested Development. However, as Winkler notes, he "went for one episode and...stayed for five years." He also returned for the later seasons in 2013 and 2018. For his portrayal of Barry Zuckerkorn, Winkler won a Gold Derby Award: Comedy Guest Actor in 2004. In 2014, Winkler was nominated as part of the cast for a Screen Actors Guild Award for Outstanding Performance by an Ensemble in a Comedy Series.

Arrested Development is known for its "inside jokes." In three episodes of the 2013 reboot, Winkler's son Max portrayed "young Barry Zuckerkorn" in flashbacks. In addition, there were a number of references to Happy Days. In Season One, Episode 17, Winkler's character Barry "looks into the mirror and does the 'no comb necessary' Fonzie pose." Later in Season Three, Episode Three, Scott Baio joined the cast as the potentially new lawyer Bob Loblaw, stating, "look, this is not the first time I've been brought in to replace Barry Zuckerkorn. I think I can do for you everything he did. Plus, I skew younger. With juries and so forth." Vulture argues that this statement is "a nod to Happy Days, where [Baio] was brought on as Chachi, to be a new teen idol as Henry Winkler got older." In addition, Barry's "hopping" over the shark on the pier in Episode 13 of the second season is a reference to Jon Hein's phrase jumping the shark. Hein coined the phrase in 1985, in response to a 1977 Happy Days episode in which Fonzie jumps over a shark while on water-skis, a stunt that drew upon Winkler's experiences as a teen-age water skiing instructor.

Hank Zipzer (2003–2019)

Hank Zipzer and Here's Hank (book series, 2003–2019)

Winkler's career as an author began with the Hank Zipzer series of children's books, about the adventures of a dyslexic child, which he co-wrote with his writing partner, Lin Oliver. Associated Press journalist Brooke Lefferts notes that the "message of the [Zipzer] books is that no matter how hard school is, it has nothing to do with intelligence."

During the early 2000s, when Winkler experienced "a lull in [his] acting career," his manager Alan Berger suggested that he write children's books about the difficulties he experienced as a child before he knew that he was dyslexic. Winkler was resistant to the idea, which he initially thought "was insane," saying that he "couldn't do it." He finally agreed however, after Berger suggested that Winkler co-write the books with an experienced author. Berger then introduced Winkler to Lin Oliver, and the two met for lunch. After Winkler described his childhood experiences Oliver recalls thinking that, "here is this very articulate accomplished man, who suffered all through childhood because he wasn't good in school. It's a very moving story. So we created a character together who is smart, funny, resourceful, popular, who's got all the gifts – except that he is bad in school."

The result of this meeting was a partnership that produced the 17 volume Hank Zipzer series of children's books. As the character is based on himself, Winkler chose "Hank," which is a nickname for Henry, and "Zipzer", the name of a neighbor in the apartment building that he grew up in, and that Hank Zipzer lives in. They created these novels through a form of collaboration that was based on their mutual background in television, that involved "discussing ideas and working them out in a room together." In addition Winkler notes, this system specifically draws upon Winkler's strengths as an actor, as he would work through ideas out loud, and Oliver's strengths as a writer. When she would read back what she had typed, they would, "argue over every word, and then [she would] say 'I have to get up, you drive me to drink.' And she gets a Snapple from the kitchen.”

After they finished the first series, Winkler and Oliver created the prequel series, Here's Hank, that explores Hank's life as a second grader, before he was diagnosed as dyslexic. The Here's Hank series also uses a special font called "dyslexie," marking the first time that this font was used in book published in the United States.

Hank Zipzer (television adaptation, 2014–2016)

Winkler and Oliver next created the television adaptation (also called Hank Zipzer) which ran for three seasons, from 2014 to 2016. According to Winkler however, they "could not sell the show in America. We couldn't sell the books. They said, 'Oh Hank Zipzer is so funny...but we won't do the television show. So we sold it to the BBC." The series appeared on the children's BBC Channel (CBBC (TV channel)). At a later date, after the series was successful on the BBC, it was broadcast on the Universal Kids Channel in the United States. Nick James was cast as Hank, while Winkler played the role of the music teacher Mr. Rock, who was based on one of Winkler's teachers at McBurney. Winkler has said that the real Mr. Rock was the only teacher in his high school who believed in him saying: "Winkler if you ever do get out of here you are going to be great." In addition, they produced the 2016 stand-alone television film, Hank Zipzer's Christmas Catastrophe. Nick James won the British Academy Children's Awards for Performer for his portrayal of Hank Zipzer in 2016.

HBO Max began streaming all three seasons of Hank Zipzer in May 2022, and Hank Zipzer's Christmas Catastrophe in December 2022.

Theatrical, film, and television roles (2004–2018)

Theater
Winkler returned to the stage in 2006 as Captain Hook in Peter Pan at the New Wimbledon Theatre, London. He reprised the role in Woking for Christmas 2007. For the 2008/2009 season, he played Captain Hook at the Milton Keynes Theatre, and once again for the 2009/2010 panto season at the Liverpool Empire. A few years later in 2012, Winkler made his third Broadway appearance as "Chuck Wood" in The Performers (November 14–18).

Television and film
Winkler has continued his work as a character actor in television and film. In television, he was nominated in 2004 for a Daytime Emmy, Outstanding Performer in an Animated Program, and in 2005, he won the Daytime Emmy, Outstanding Performer in an Animated Program, for his voice-work as Norville in Clifford's Puppy Days. Additional television roles include Dr. Stewart Barnes in Out of Practice (2005–2006), Eddie R. Lawson in Royal Pains (2010–2016), Sy Mittleman in Childrens Hospital (2010–2016), Dr. Saperstein in Parks and Recreation (2013–2015), and himself in Bojack Horseman (2015).

His film roles include Uncle Ralph in the Christmas film The Most Wonderful Time of the Year (2008), Marty Streb in Here Comes the Boom (2012), Ed Koch in Donald Trump's The Art of the Deal: The Movie (a 2016 film that also starred Ron Howard), and Grandpa Bill in All I Want for Christmas Is You (2017).

Better Late Than Never (2016–2018)

Winkler was both an executive producer for, and star of, the 2016–2018 American reality-travel show, Better Late Than Never. He starred along with William Shatner, Terry Bradshaw, George Foreman, and Jeff Dye, in this adaptation of the South Korean reality series, Grandpas Over Flowers.

Winkler was the focus of the Season 2 episode "Berlin: How Do You Say Roots in German?" as the group explored the city from which his parents escaped in 1939. The journey culminated at the site of a brass memorial plaque, known as a stolperstein, embedded in the pavement in front of the workplace and home of his uncle, Helmut Winkler. Helmut was originally scheduled to join Winkler's parents in 1939 on their business trip to the United States, but decided to stay behind and leave at a later date. The stolperstein reveals his fate, stating in German: "Here lived Helmut Theodor Winkler/Born 1909/Escaped 1940 Holland/Interned Westerbork/Deported 1942 Auschwitz/Murdered December 31, 1942."

The discovery came as a complete surprise to Winkler, as Jeff Dye had secretly enlisted the help of Winkler's children, who planned the surprise. A letter from them was waiting near the Stolperstein, and told Winkler that all of his experiences in Berlin reflected his parents' life there: "Even though the Winkler history in Berlin is heartbreaking, we thought it was important for you to connect with the past through this hopefully fun adventure, and connect you did...."

Additional books (2011–present)
Winkler's 2011 memoir I've Never Met an Idiot on the River explores his interest in fly fishing. The next year, he and his writing partner Lin Oliver created the Ghost Buddy book series (2012–2013), about the friendship between the protagonist Billy and a "ghost buddy." 

A few years later they wrote the science fiction trilogy Alien Superstar (2019–2021). The adventures of Alien Superstars protagonist are loosely based on Winker's own experiences after arriving in Los Angeles as he, "left New York on September 18th, 1973. I had just made The Lords of Flatbush. I had a thousand dollars in my pocket. I could stay in Hollywood for one month....in the very first week, I got a part on The Mary Tyler Moore Show. It was four lines. They let me ad-lib it to eight. In the second week, I auditioned for 'The Fonz.'"

Winkler will be releasing a new memoir in 2024.

Barry and additional roles (2018–present)

When Bill Hader developed the 2018–present HBO comedy Barry with Alec Berg, he asked HBO if they could "get" Winkler for the part of acting teacher Gene Cousineau. According to Hader, he was "out of [his] mind" when HBO told him that Winkler was coming to audition for the role. In addition, Winkler's son Max, who is a director, helped him to prepare for this audition. Winkler has also noted parallels between Barry and his time on Happy Days. He "was 27 when I did the Fonz, and now, I'm 72. I just flipped the numbers." In his role as Cousineau, he wears Garry Marshall's tie as "a tribute to my mentor." Finally, after finishing a scene on Stage 19 of the Paramount lot for Barry, he realized that it was "the very sound stage where for nine years we shot Happy Days."

Portraying Gene Cousineau has allowed Winkler to draw upon decades of experience with acting teachers, as "no matter where you go to acting class, there is somebody like Gene Cousineau in there...everybody that I have talked to that has watched the show, or even over the years, talking about their drama teachers, they relate to the man or woman who just tries to annihilate you.” In addition, he added his own insight into the character. Winkler states that when "they wrote it, my character was much darker, much colder—really cynical. Then, they kept writing Gene to me. They said, 'Oh my god, you're bringing such warmth to the character. We did not see that existed.' " Finally, Winkler has continued his lifelong habit of improvising when he forgot his lines, something he has "done my whole career—except I drove Bill mad. He would say to me, 'Could you just do it once the way it's written, so I could hear what we’ve got?' I would say, 'Yes, Bill. I'm going to.' Then, my mind would go to the left. If it worked, they kept it; if it wasn't, both Alec and Bill would guide you to where they imagined it to be."

Winkler received his first Primetime Emmy in 2018 for his portrayal of Gene Cousineau. He also won two Critics' Choice Television Awards for Best Supporting Actor in a Comedy Series in 2019 and 2023. In addition, he received three Primetime Emmy nominations, three Golden Globe nominations, and fourScreen Actors Guild Awards nominations for the role. In discussing his success with the role, Winkler told Variety:

Additional film and television roles
In television, roles include Fritz in the 2021–present computer-animated streaming television series Monsters at Work. In film, roles include Uncle Joe in Wes Anderson's 2021 release The French Dispatch, and a cameo appearance as Al Pratt (Uncle Al) in the 2022 release Black Adam.

Filmography and accolades

Winkler states that during his lifetime, he has worked with "five directing geniuses": Garry Marshall (Happy Days), Adam Sandler, Mitch Hurwitz (Arrested Development), Bill Hader and Alec Berg (Barry).

After portraying Fonzie on Happy Days, Winkler evolved into a character actor, with roles that include the high school principal Arthur Himbry in Scream, Coach Klein in The Waterboy, Barry Zuckerkorn in Arrested Development, Sy Mittleman in Childrens Hospital, Dr. Saperstein in Parks and Recreation, Mr. Rock in the Hank Zipzer BBC series, Eddie R. Lawson in Royal Pains, Fritz in Monsters at Work, Uncle Joe in The French Dispatch, Al Pratt in Black Adam, and Gene Cousineau in Barry. He is also the recipient of a Primetime Emmy, two Golden Globe Awards, two Critics Choice Awards, and two Daytime Emmys.

Personal life

Winkler met Stacey (formerly Weitzman; née Furstman) in a Los Angeles clothing store in 1976, and they married in 1978, in the synagogue where he had his bar mitzvah. They have two children, Max and Zoe, and Jed Weitzman, Stacey's son from her previous marriage with Howard Weitzman, is Winkler's stepson. In addition, almost 80 years after his parents had left Germany in 2018, Winkler returned to Berlin for the television show Better Late Than Never and shared their story on the Season 2 episode "Berlin: How Do You Say Roots in German?". Finally, Winkler continues to remain close with members of the Happy Days cast, telling the Hollywood Reporter in November 2021, that "I loved the people. They are still my friends. Tomorrow, I am taking Marion Ross to lunch for her 93rd birthday. Ron [Howard] is like my brother, my younger brother; and [fellow castmembers] Anson [Williams] and Donny [Most], we talk all the time."

Winkler contributed via Zoom to social justice issues during the COVID-19 pandemic. On May 7, 2020, the Office of the Governor of California posted a video of Winkler on Facebook and Twitter reminding Californians to practice physical distancing and to follow stay-at-home orders. 

During this time, Winkler also offered aid "to SAG-AFTRA artists and their families"  in May 2021 through a virtual table read of Season 3, Episode 2 ("The Motorcycle," 1975) of Happy Days. Winkler reprised the role of "Fonzie," while SAG members Glenn Close, John Carroll Lynch, Eli Goree, Aldis Hodge, Jamie Chung, Luke Newton, and Nicola Coughlan read the roles of Marion Cunningham, Howard Cunningham, Richie Cunningham, Ralph Malph, Joanie Cunningham, Potsie, and a waitress at Al's diner.

Legacy

The Fonz

TV Guide ranked "The Fonz" as No. 4 on its "50 Greatest TV Characters of All Time" list in 1999, and a 2001 poll conducted by Channel 4 in the UK, ranked him as 13th on their list of the 100 Greatest TV Characters. 

When asked which books influenced him in childhood, American journalist Anderson Cooper, who is likewise dyslexic, responded that, "I also loved the Fonz and read a book when I was around 8 called The Fonz: The Henry Winkler Story. I actually keep it in my office at CNN. Henry Winkler was very important to me when I was a child. Meeting him as an adult — and discovering what a kind and gracious person he is — was amazing." This sentiment reflects National Museum of American History, Smithsonian Institution curator Eric Jentsch's statement on the description of Fonzie's leather jacket that Winkler donated to the Smithsonian in 1980: "Fonzie was a representation of cool at a time when you were learning about what cool was."

Winkler won two Golden Globe Awards, and earned three Emmy Award nominations for Outstanding Lead Actor in a Comedy Series for the role. In 1981, he received a Star on the Hollywood Walk of Fame (for Television), largely due to his portrayal of Fonzie. A few decades later, American artist Gerald P. Sawyer, unveiled the Bronze Fonz on the Milwaukee Riverwalk in downtown Milwaukee, Wisconsin on August 18, 2008.

Hank Zipzer and dyslexia awareness
Winkler would eventually be recognized for contributing to a greater understanding of dyslexia through the Hank Zipzer series. He was given the Key to the City of Winnipeg for "contributions to education and literacy" in 2010, was appointed an Honorary Officer of the Order of the British Empire (OBE) "for services to children with special educational needs and dyslexia in the UK" by Queen Elizabeth in 2011, was named one of the United Kingdom's Top 10 Literacy Heroes in 2013, and was awarded the Bill Rosendahl Public Service Award for Contributions to the Public Good for his children's books in 2019.

Books

Books by Winkler
Standalone
 
 

Series
 Winkler, Henry (with Lin Oliver). Hank Zipzer: The World's Greatest Underachiever (18 volumes, 2003–2010, 2015).
 Winkler, Henry (with Lin Oliver). Ghost Buddy (4 volumes, 2012–2013).
 Winkler, Henry (with Lin Oliver). Here's Hank (12 volumes, 2014–2019).
 Winkler, Henry (with Lin Oliver). Alien Superstar (3 volumes, 2019–2021).

Books about Winkler

See also
 List of breakout characters
 List of children's literature writers
 List of people with dyslexia
 List of public art in Milwaukee
 List of stars on the Hollywood Walk of Fame

References

Further reading
Klam, Matthew. "Henry Winkler Breaks the Curse of Stardom." The New York Times Magazine, April 27, 2022. 
 Gold Award candidate seeks help of Henry Winkler for school library project, CentralJersey.com, August 18, 2021.

External links
 
 
 Henry Winkler on Playbill
 
 
 
  (2006)

Interviews
 Henry Winkler Interview – The Merv Griffin Show, November 2, 1977
‘Happy Days’: Henry Winkler Expressed Why He Didn’t Feel ‘Imprisoned’ by Hollywood in 1979 (video) - Outsider
 Henry Winkler describes watching 'Happy Days' with grandson – Anderson Cooper Full Circle, 2020
 Henry Winkler On Surviving ‘Barry’ & Hollywood, Being A TV Legend & His Steve McQueen Connection – Deadline Hollywood, August 17, 2022

Dyslexia
 Henry Winkler Interview – Hank Zipzer – CBBC, August 5, 2016
Sunday Profile: Henry Winkler - CBS News Sunday Morning, Jan. 22, 2017
 One-On-One With Henry Winkler – MSNBC, The 11th Hour with Stephanie Ruhle, June 10, 2022

1945 births
Living people
20th-century American comedians
20th-century American Jews
20th-century American male actors
21st-century American comedians
21st-century American Jews
21st-century American male actors
21st-century American male writers
American children's writers
American male comedians
American male film actors
American male television actors
American male voice actors
American people of German-Jewish descent
American television directors
Best Musical or Comedy Actor Golden Globe (television) winners
Comedians from New York City
Daytime Emmy Award winners
Emerson College alumni
Film directors from New York City
Honorary Officers of the Order of the British Empire
Jewish American male actors
Jewish American male comedians
Jewish American writers
Jewish male comedians
Male actors from New York City
McBurney School alumni
Outstanding Performance by a Supporting Actor in a Comedy Series Primetime Emmy Award winners
People from the Upper West Side
Actors with dyslexia
Writers with dyslexia
Primetime Emmy Award winners
Television producers from New York City
Writers from Manhattan
Yale School of Drama alumni